The British Rail Class 171 Turbostar is a type of diesel multiple unit (DMU) passenger train built by Bombardier Transportation at Derby Litchurch Lane Works in England. It is identical to the Class 170, except for the replacement of the BSI coupler with a Dellner coupler. This provision was made to allow emergency joining with Class 377 DC third-rail electric units, which Southern runs extensively on most lines. The units work on the southern regions of the British railway system, operating services from London Bridge to Uckfield and from Eastbourne to Ashford International, these routes being unelectrified between Hurst Green Junction and Uckfield and between Ore and Ashford International, respectively.

The fleet is operated by Govia Thameslink Railway on Southern services.

Design

The Southern fleet is fitted with coupling devices (Dellner) different from other Turbostars, and is classified as Class 171 for this reason. The four-car units were built with the new couplers, but Class 170 two-car units were fitted at a later date, and reclassified as Class 171/7 after the modification. Three more two-car units were later acquired, but these were built from new with the new couplers.

Southern gained 170392 from South West Trains. The coupler on this unit has also been changed to the Dellner type. The unit has been reclassified and renumbered from 170392 to 171730. This unit was first delivered carrying Southern livery and the number 170727 (because SWT needed another 170 and it was cheaper to place another unit on the Southern order than place a new order). It never operated in this form and was transferred to South West Trains where it became 170392.

These trains have electronic onboard displays and automated next station announcements.

Seating

Class 171s have mainly standard-class seating plus either nine first-class seats on a two-car or 18 on a four-car; all first-class seats are reclining and have AC power sockets adjacent to the seats.

Standard-class seating includes five full-size folding seats in the area by the universal toilet on the DMOCL(W) vehicle. With these seats folded there is room for wheelchair users and bicycles. Each passenger door vestibule area also has two flip-down seats.

Operations

Southern acquired an initial fleet of six two-car Class 171/7 and six four-car Class 171/8 units, to replace the slam-door Class 205 and Class 207 "Thumper" fleet.

Services from London Bridge to Uckfield went over to Turbostar operation in late 2004.

The Ashford-Eastbourne service, as well as peak-time Ashford-Rye and Ashford-Hastings shuttle services, are nearly always operated by the two-car Class 171/7; the four-car Class 171/8 units occasionally appear on the route during special events such as the Rye bonfire celebrations.

The Uckfield-London Bridge and Uckfield-Oxted services use both the two-car and the four-car units. These units are often coupled together, forming six-car, eight-car or ten-car trains following platform extensions at Uckfield line stations.

Future
As at August 2022, Southern operated 20 sets; 12 two-carriage sets and eight four-carriage sets. In September 2022 the two Class 171/2 and two Class 171/4 sets were reformed back into their original three carriage formations, returned to Eversholt Rail Group and leased to East Midlands Railway (EMR). Three moved to EMR where they will be converted back to Class 170s while the fourth will remain on sub-lease with Southern. Further reshuffling will result in Southern having a fleet of four two-carriage and 13 three-carriage sets by December 2022.

In September 2022, 171202, 171401 and 171402 were transferred to East Midlands Railway and renumbered to 170422, 170423 and 170424 before being renumbered to Class 170s/9s.

Fleet details

Initial deliveries took place when the original two-car units, at the time classified as Class 170/7, entered service in 2003, followed by the four-car Class 171/8 units in 2004. At this time, the two-car sets received their Dellner couplings and were reclassified as Class 171/7. In 2015, four thre-car Class 170/4 units were transferred to Southern from First ScotRail to enhance the fleet; two of these had the centre car removed and added to the remaining two, to form a pair of two-car and a pair of four-car units. With the addition of Dellner couplings, the new units were reclassified as Class 171/2 and 171/4.

Formation of two-car Class 171/7: DMOCL(W) + DMOSL

Formation of four-car Class 171/8: DMOCL(W) + MOS + MOS + DMOCL

References

External links

Bombardier Transportation multiple units
171
Train-related introductions in 2003